Cophyla berara is a species of frog in the family Microhylidae.
It is endemic to Madagascar.
Its natural habitat is subtropical or tropical dry forests.
It is threatened by habitat loss.

References

Sources

Cophyla
Endemic frogs of Madagascar
Taxonomy articles created by Polbot
Amphibians described in 2005